The Human Side is a 1934 American drama film directed by Edward Buzzell and written by Edward Buzzell, Frank Craven and Ernest Pascal. The film stars Adolphe Menjou, Doris Kenyon, Charlotte Henry, Reginald Owen, Joseph Cawthorn and Betty Lawford. The film was released on September 1, 1934, by Universal Pictures.

Plot

Cast 
Adolphe Menjou as Gregory Sheldon
Doris Kenyon as Vera Sheldon
Charlotte Henry as Lucille Sheldon
Reginald Owen as James Dalton
Joseph Cawthorn as Fritz Speigal
Betty Lawford as Alma Hastings
Dickie Moore as Bobbie Sheldon
George Ernest as Tom Sheldon
Dick Winslow as Phil Sheldon

References

External links 
 

1934 films
1930s English-language films
American drama films
1934 drama films
Universal Pictures films
Films directed by Edward Buzzell
American black-and-white films
1930s American films